Mosetén–Chon is a proposal linking the Mosetenan languages (actually a single language, Chimane or Tsimané) and the Chonan languages of South America. Kaufman (1990) finds the connection fairly convincing.

References

Proposed language families
Indigenous languages of the Americas